Sealskin is the skin of a seal.

Seal skins have been used by aboriginal people for millennia to make waterproof jackets and boots, and seal fur to make fur coats. Sailors used to have tobacco pouches made from sealskin. Canada, Greenland, Norway, Russia and Namibia all export sealskin. It was traditionally used to make Scottish sporrans. 

The Inuit, a group of people indigenous to North America, argue that banning both seal products and seal hunting is detrimental to their way of life and the Inuit culture. However, many non-Inuit object to the use of seal skin, fur and pelts, and it is illegal to hunt seals in many countries, particularly young seals. The value of global sealskin exports in 2006 was over CA$16 million.

Pinseal is the term for sealskin leather.

References

Hides (skin)
Pinnipeds
Seal hunting